Ángela Loij (Ranch Sara, Rio Grande, around 1900 - 28 May 1974) was the last surviving full-blooded Ona native woman of Tierra del Fuego.

The Ona were decimated by loss of land, European diseases and the Selk'nam genocide. She was studied by anthropologist Anne Chapman. Loij was born at Sara, north of the Río Grande, where her father worked as shepherd.

References 

Selk'nam people
Indigenous people of the Southern Cone
Last known speakers of a language
1974 deaths
People from Río Grande, Tierra del Fuego
Argentine people of indigenous peoples descent
Year of birth uncertain